Jason Gill is an American baseball coach and former shortstop and third baseman. He played college baseball for Cuesta College, Cal State Dominguez Hills and Cal State Fullerton from 1991 to 1994. He then served as the head coach of the Loyola Marymount Lions (2009–2019) the USC Trojans (2019–2022).

Playing career
Gill attended Mater Dei High School in Santa Ana, California. He then accepted a scholarship to play at Cuesta College, to play college baseball. He was named an honorable mention All-Western State Conference. After two seasons at Cuesta, Gill then went on to play at Cal State Dominguez Hills. While at Dominguez Hills, Gill was name an honorable mention All-California Collegiate Athletic Association. Gill then moved on to Cal State Fullerton to play his senior season. He batted .345 with .469 on base percentage and slugged .388. He was named a Second Team All-West Coast Conference performer.

Coaching career
Gill then served as a graduate assistant at Fullerton for two seasons while completing his degree. Gill then spent two season as an assistant coach for the Nevada Wolf Pack baseball team. He then accepted a role as an assistant for the Loyola Marymount Lions baseball program. Gill then spent three seasons as an assistant for the UC Irvine Anteaters baseball team. He then returned to Cal State Fullerton as an assistant for three seasons.

On August 13, 2008, Gill was named the head coach of the Loyola Marymount program. In 2011, Gill was interviewed for the head coaching position at Cal State Fullerton, but remained with the Lions.

On June 14, 2019, Gill was hired to be the new head coach of the USC Trojans baseball program. On June 6, 2022, Gill and Trojans agreed to mutually part ways.

Head coaching record

References

External links
Loyola Marymount Lions bio
USC Trojans bio

Living people
1970 births
Baseball first basemen
Cuesta Cougars baseball players
Cal State Dominguez Hills Toros baseball players
Cal State Fullerton Titans baseball players
Cal State Fullerton Titans baseball coaches
Nevada Wolf Pack baseball coaches
Loyola Marymount Lions baseball coaches
UC Irvine Anteaters baseball coaches
Oregon Ducks baseball coaches
USC Trojans baseball coaches